Christopher Akinyemi, better known by his stage name Chris Akinyemi (Sometimes shortened to ChrisA) is a Nigerian-American musician. He released his first single "Radio", which was featured on major music outlets such as mtvU, BET and other major media outlets.

On January 1, 2011 Chris Akinyemi released his second single  Teenage Love. On January 17, 2011, his music video "Radio" premiered on mtvU and was featured on mtvU's "The Freshmen" and his music video was added to MTV and VH1. On January 24, 2011 Chris Akinyemi was interviewed on mtvU's "The Hot Seat".

References

External links 

BET.COM Music Blog  by Eb the Celeb August 24, 2010
CENTRICTV.COM  by Staff August 30, 2010
OURSTAGE.COM  September 9, 2010
Eb the Celeb  August 17, 2010
 MODERNGHANA.COM
 CENTRIC.TV

Living people
Singer-songwriters from New Jersey
21st-century Nigerian male singers
American male singer-songwriters
American male pop singers
American acoustic guitarists
Yoruba musicians
Yoruba-language singers
Nigerian singer-songwriters
American male guitarists
American people of Yoruba descent
American people of Nigerian descent
Guitarists from New Jersey
21st-century American male singers
21st-century American singers
Year of birth missing (living people)